Elections to Vale of White Horse District Council were held on 3 May 2007.  The whole council was up for election and the council stayed under Liberal Democrat control with an increased majority. Turnout was significantly higher in many wards than it was in 2003.

Election results 

Composition of the council following the 2007 election:

Liberal Democrat 34
Conservative 17

Ward Results

References

2007
2007 English local elections
2000s in Oxfordshire